Lautaro Javier Martínez (born 22 August 1997) is an Argentine professional footballer who plays as a striker for  club Inter Milan and the Argentina national team.

Martínez began his football career in his native Argentina, where he made his senior debut in 2015 with Racing Club. There he spent four seasons and represented the club in the league and Copa Libertadores, scoring 28 goals in 60 appearances before joining Inter in 2018, where he won the Serie A title in his third season with the club.

Martínez also previously represented Argentina at various youth levels and competed at the 2017 South American U-20 Championship and 2017 FIFA U-20 World Cup. He made his senior international debut in 2018, and represented the senior squad at the Copa América in 2019, helping his team to a third place finish, and 2021, winning the latter edition of the tournament. He was also a part of the Argentina side that won the 2022 FIFA World Cup.

Club career

Early career
Martínez was born in Bahía Blanca. He followed in his father's footsteps to become a professional footballer, joining local side Liniers, with whom he excelled at U–17 level. In 2013, he scored 13 goals in the U–17 league and netted in the final of the National Cup, though Liniers ultimately lost on penalties to Rosario.

Racing Club
Martínez's form at youth level caught the attention of Racing Club interim coach Fabio Radaelli who subsequently signed him in January 2014. Soon after joining the club, Martínez began suffering from homesickness and wanted to return to his hometown. He was ultimately convinced by teammate Braian Mansilla to stay and went on to score 53 goals in 64 appearances for the club's reserve side. In 2015, a deal was concluded between Racing Club and Spanish side Real Madrid for Martínez's signature but he chose to remain in Argentina. Martínez's father, Mario later revealed that he chose to stay with Racing at the time as he was not ready to leave the club. His league debut followed on 1 November 2015 when he came on as a second-half substitute for Diego Milito in a 3–0 win over Crucero del Norte. On 17 April 2016, he was sent off for the first time in his career after picking up two bookings in the space of five minutes in a 2–2 draw with Argentinos. He scored his first goal later that year, netting the opener in a 1–1 draw with Huracán in November.

Following an injury to regular starting striker Lisandro López, Martínez assumed a more senior role for the 2016–17 season, scoring 9 goals in 23 league appearances for the campaign. He continued to lead the line for Racing during the first half of the following season and in December 2017 underwent a medical with La Liga side Atlético Madrid. Reports followed that Martínez had signed for Atlético Madrid side but Racing later announced that he had signed a renewed contract which included an increased release clause. They also criticised their Spanish contemporaries for submitting him to a medical without their permission. He ended the year with a man of the match performance, scoring once and assisting another in a 3–1 win over Gimnasia. On 27 February, he scored his second hat-trick of the season when he scored three times on his Copa Libertadores debut against Brazilian side Cruzeiro. Racing won the match 4–2.

That same month, Martínez was linked with a transfer to Italian side Inter Milan and on 5 May Racing Club President Victor Blanco confirmed that the sale had gone through. Blanco indicated that Martínez was set to join Inter ahead of the 2018–19 Serie A campaign but that he would attempt to keep him on loan until December 2018 in order for the striker to continue to participate in the Argentine side's Copa Libertadores campaign.

Inter Milan
Martínez officially joined Inter on 4 July 2018 for a reported fee of €22.7 million and he signed a five-year contract with the club. He made his unofficial debut ten days later and scored in a 3–0 friendly win over Swiss club, Lugano. His full debut followed on 19 August when he started in a 1–0 Serie A loss to Sassuolo in the opening week. He scored his first league goal against Cagliari, the opener of a 2–0 win at San Siro on 29 September.

Martínez scored his first European goal on 14 February 2019, netting a penalty to help Inter win against Rapid Wien, in the first leg of 2018–19 UEFA Europa League round of 32. Following this match, he began to start in every match, profiting from Mauro Icardi's abstence due to personal reasons. In his first Derby della Madonnina match against city rivals Milan, Martínez first assisted Matías Vecino's header before scoring himself a penalty in the second half, helping Inter to win 3–2; Inter retook the third place in Serie A, and also achieved the first league double over them since 2011–12 season.

On 2 October 2019, Martínez scored his first goal in UEFA Champions League in a 2–1 away defeat to Barcelona in group stage; he became the first player since Roberto Boninsegna in 1970 to score at Camp Nou for Inter. Later in the competition, by scoring a brace in a 3–1 away win against Slavia Prague, Martínez reached two milestones: he became only the fourth Inter player (after Hernán Crespo in 2002, Christian Vieri in 2003 and Samuel Eto'o in 2010) and the fifth Argentinian player (after Hernan Crespo in 2002, Lionel Messi in six occasions, Sergio Agüero in 2019 and Ezequiel Lavezzi in 2013) to score in four consecutive Champions League games. On 17 August 2020, Martínez scored a brace in a 5–0 win against Shakhtar Donetsk to reach the 2020 UEFA Europa League Final. On 8 March 2022, Martínez scored against Liverpool in a 1–0 victory at Anfield, marking Inter's first Champions League knockout goal in 3,647 days.

International career

Youth team

In 2017, Martínez represented Argentina at the 2017 South American U-20 Championship where he ended as the tournament's joint-top scorer with five goals, in the process helping Argentina qualify for the 2017 FIFA U-20 World Cup.

He was subsequently named in the squad for the World Cup which kicked off in May that year. In the build-up to the tournament, he suffered damage to his nasal cartilage after being struck by a knee in a warm-up match against Vietnam. As a result of the injury, he started Argentina's opening match at the tournament against England from the bench and was later sent off after video technology indicated that he had lashed out at Fikayo Tomori. Upon doing so, he became the first ever player to be dismissed after a video referral, and Argentina ultimately lost the match 3–0. On his return, he scored a brace in a 5–0 win over Guinea, though his goals were not enough to prevent Argentina from being eliminated from the group-stages.

Senior team
On 12 March 2018, Martínez received his first call-up for the senior team for two friendly matches against Italy and Spain. He made his debut against the latter on 27 March, coming on as a substitute for Gonzalo Higuaín in a 6–1 defeat. In May 2018 he was named in Argentina’s preliminary squad for the 2018 FIFA World Cup in Russia but was omitted from the final selection. Later that year, he made his full debut in a 4–0 friendly win over Iraq during which he also scored his first senior international goal.

In May 2019, Martínez was included in Lionel Scaloni's final 23-man Argentina squad for the 2019 Copa América. In Argentina's final group match against Qatar on 23 June, he scored the opening goal in a 2–0 win, which enabled them to advanced to the knock-out stages of the competition. On 28 June, in the quarter-finals of the tournament, Martínez scored the opening goal in an eventual 2–0 win over Venezuela with a back-heel in the opening ten minutes of the match; he was later named Man of the match, and the victory enabled Argentina to advance to the semi-finals of the competition.

On 10 September 2019, Martínez scored his first international hat-trick in a friendly against Mexico, which Argentina won 4–0.

On 28 June 2021, he scored Argentina's final goal in a 4–1 win over Bolivia in his nation's final group match of the 2021 Copa América. On 3 July, he scored the second goal in a 3–0 win over Ecuador in the quarter-finals of the competition. On 6 July, Martínez scored the opening goal in a 1–1 draw in the semi-finals against Colombia; he later netted his spot kick in Argentina's eventual 3–2 penalty shoot-out victory to progress to the final.

On 1 June 2022, Martínez scored the opening goal and provided an assist for Ángel Di María in a 3–0 over reigning European Champions Italy at Wembley Stadium in the 2022 Finalissima.

He was included in the final 26-man squad for the 2022 FIFA World Cup by Lionel Scaloni. On 9 December 2022, Martínez scored the winning penalty in Argentina's 4–3 shoot-out victory against the Netherlands to send his side into the semi-finals. On 18 December, he replaced Julián Álvarez in extra-time as Argentina defeated France 4–2 in the penalty shoot-out after the match ended 3–3 in extra-time to win the World Cup.

Style of play
After initially playing as a central defender in his youth, Martínez later established himself as a forward, citing Radamel Falcao as one of his major influences. A dynamic, quick, agile, and technically gifted player, who is a prolific goalscorer, he is known for his elegant playing style, good dribbling skills, and clinical finishing ability, as well as surprising physical strength and aerial prowess despite his diminutive stature; however, he has also drawn criticism from pundits for his lack of accuracy from the penalty spot. Possessing good link-up play, defensive contribution, and an ability to drop deep off the ball to either press opponents or drag them out of position, he is also a highly creative and hard-working player, who is capable of assisting goals as well as scoring them himself; as such, he is also able to play as a second striker, in addition to his usual role as either a centre-forward or out–and–out striker. Due to his leadership, tenacity, and mentality on the pitch, he has been nicknamed El Toro ("The Bull," in Spanish). In 2020, Spencer Rance of 90min.com considered Martínez to be one of the most promising young players in world football, while manager Mauricio Pochettino rated him as one of the best strikers in the world. Former Argentina and Inter striker Hernán Crespo likened Martínez to compatriot Sergio Agüero in 2020.

Career statistics

Club

International

Scores and results list Argentina's goal tally first, score column indicates score after each Martínez goal.

Honours
Inter Milan
Serie A: 2020–21
Coppa Italia: 2021–22
Supercoppa Italiana: 2021, 2022
UEFA Europa League runner-up: 2019–20

Argentina
FIFA World Cup: 2022
Copa América: 2021
CONMEBOL–UEFA Cup of Champions: 2022

Individual
UEFA Europa League Squad of the Season: 2019–20
South American Youth Football Championship Top scorer: 2017

References

External links

Inter Milan official profile

1997 births
Living people
Sportspeople from Bahía Blanca
Argentine footballers
Association football forwards
Racing Club de Avellaneda footballers
Inter Milan players
Argentine Primera División players
Serie A players
Argentina under-20 international footballers
Argentina international footballers
2019 Copa América players
2021 Copa América players
2022 FIFA World Cup players
Copa América-winning players
FIFA World Cup-winning players
Argentine expatriate footballers
Expatriate footballers in Italy
Argentine expatriate sportspeople in Italy